VH1 Italia is a 24-hour music entertainment channel operated by Paramount Networks EMEAA which launched on July 1, 2016 replacing the Italian version of MTV Music which launched on March 1, 2011 on digital terrestrial television. VH1 Italia is available over-the-air across Italy.

The channel uses the slogan 'Music 4 Life' on all online and on-air branding. The channel uses the existing VH1 branding and idents from VH1's international creative campaign. The channel uses a mix of domestic and non-domestic music videos and artists. Italian artists are used in segments in order to promote the new channel - VH1 Italia: Music 4 Life.

Logos

Shows

Current programmes
Classics and Pearls
Top Chart
Wake Up
Top Chart Right Now
Right Now 
Simply The Best
Top Chart 2 Anni Fa
VH1 Official Chart

Previous programmes
Best Of ...
Past vs. Present
Top 10 Right Now
Top 10 Italians

See also
 MTV (European TV channel)
 Paramount Networks EMEAA

References

External links
VH1 Italia 

Television channels in Italy
Television channels and stations established in 2016
VH1
Music organisations based in Italy